Pagramian Sports Club was a Lebanese-Armenian sports and cultural organisation linked to the Lebanese Communist Party.

Named after the military commander the Soviet Marshal Ivan Bagramyan, it was formed in the 1944. The club was shut down by the Lebanese government during the presidency of Fouad Chehab in 1960. In 1969, Ararad SA was formed as a continuation of Pagramian.

History

Pagramian was founded at the beginning of October 1944 by Homenetmen players who decided form a new club. Other football players from Antranik and Homenmen also joined. They were affiliated to the Lebanese Football Association (LFA) from the 1945–46 season. Pagramian won the Municipal Cup, organised by the LFA, in their debut season. In 1946–47 they won the Lebanese Second Division. Pagramian were finalists of the 1947 Lebanese FA Cup, losing 2–1 to Nahda. In 1949 Pagramian took part in the Beirut Committee of football clubs.

Ahead of the 1957 parliamentary election, Pagramian Sports Club and other anti-Tashnag (anti-ARF) Lebanese Armenian sports associations like Homenmen (affiliated with the Hunchaks), Antranik (affiliated with the Ramgavars), Veradznunt, and Tekeyan-Baykar organized a "Pan-Armenian Festival" on 22 April 1957, under the patronage of Archbishop Khat Atchabahian. Around 2,000 athletes took part in the event, which had around 25,000 spectators at the Beirut Municipal Stadium.

On 10 June 1957, the day of the election, three people (Krikor Vrtanessian, Bedros Kdjoyan and Levon Kdjoyan) were shot dead in front of the Pagramian club offices. The club blamed the Tashnag party for the killings.

The Pagramian Sports Club was shut down by the Lebanese government in 1960. In 1969 the Ararad Sports Association was set up to fill the void after the dissolution of Pagramian.

Honours 

 Lebanese FA Cup
 Runners-up (1): 1946–47

References

Pagramian SC
1944 establishments in Lebanon
1960 disestablishments in Lebanon
Sports clubs established in 1924
Sports clubs disestablished in 1960
Association football clubs established in 1944
Association football clubs disestablished in 1960
Armenian association football clubs outside Armenia
Armenian football clubs in Lebanon
Diaspora sports clubs
Football clubs in Lebanon
Sport in Beirut
Lebanese Communist Party
Communist sports organizations
Defunct football clubs in Lebanon